Meioglossus psammophilus is a species of acorn worm in the family Harrimaniidae, the only known species of the genus Meigolossus. It inhabits the Western Caribbean and Bermuda. The name of the species derives from two Greek words; psammon and philos which in translation means friend of the sands in reference to adult stage of species' lifestyle. It is able to reproduce asexually through paratomy.

References

Animals described in 2012
Articles containing video clips
Enteropneusta